Tandjouaré is a small town in northern Togo. It is the capital of the Tandjouaré prefecture and lies approximately 20 kilometres from the regional capital of Dapaong.
The town lies in a heavily protected area of Togo in the southern part of  Fosse aux Lions National Park, with Foret de Barkosassi to the southeast. It contains a library and a secondary school.

References

Populated places in Savanes Region, Togo